Marta Gęga (born 16 April 1986) is a Polish handballer for MKS Lublin and the Polish national team.

She represented Poland at the 2020 European Women's Handball Championship.

References

External links

1986 births
Living people
People from Bielawa
Polish female handball players
Expatriate handball players
Polish expatriate sportspeople in France
21st-century Polish women